Otis Mitch Willis (born March 16, 1962) is a former professional American football nose tackle/defensive tackle in the National Football League. He played  six seasons for the Los Angeles Raiders (1985–1988), the Atlanta Falcons (1988), and the Dallas Cowboys (1990).

1962 births
Living people
American football defensive tackles
Atlanta Falcons players
Dallas Cowboys players
Lamar High School (Arlington, Texas) alumni
Los Angeles Raiders players
Players of American football from Dallas
SMU Mustangs football players